Komarovo is a rural locality (a village) in Dobryansky District, Perm Krai, Russia. The population was 1 as of 2010. There are 3 streets.

References 

Rural localities in Dobryansky District